Zharchikhite is a halide mineral, a hydroxyl fluoride of aluminium; formula AlF(OH)2. It forms colourless, transparent crystals.  Discovered in 1968, it is named after its original locality, the Zharchinskoya Deposit, which is in Buryatia, Russia.

References

Webmineral - Zharchikhite

Aluminium minerals
Fluorine minerals
Monoclinic minerals